ALMS1, centrosome and basal body associated protein is a protein that in humans is encoded by the ALMS1 gene.

Function

This gene encodes a protein containing a large tandem-repeat domain as well as additional low complexity regions. The encoded protein functions in microtubule organization, particularly in the formation and maintenance of cilia. Mutations in this gene cause Alstrom syndrome. There is a pseudogene for this gene located adjacent in the same region of chromosome 2. Alternative splice variants have been described but their full length nature has not been determined. [provided by RefSeq, Apr 2014].

References

Further reading